Index is an extinct town in Cass County, in the U.S. state of Missouri. 

Index was platted in 1857. A post office called Index was established in 1874, and remained in operation until 1903.

References

Ghost towns in Missouri
Former populated places in Cass County, Missouri
1857 establishments in Missouri